Guo Tao (born December 17, 1969) is a Chinese actor.

Guo was born in Xi'an. He graduated from Central Academy of Drama in 1992. His son and he appeared as main cast of Chinese version TV show Where Are We Going, Dad? (TV series) and its film Where Are We Going, Dad? (film)

Filmography
1991 Three brothers
1993 Fang Shiyu
1994 To Live
1997 Spicy Love Soup
1998 So Close to Paradise
2002 No Lonely Angels
2004 Green Hat
2006 Crazy Stone
2006 2 Become 1
2007 Phoenix
2007 Getting Home
2007 Kidnap
2007 Two Stupid Eggs
2008 Marriage Trap
2008 Desires of the Heart (桃花运)
2008 Out of Control
2009 Gao Xing (高兴)
2009 All's Well, Ends Well 2009
2009 Weaving Girl
2009 Chengdu, I Love You
2010 Once Upon a Chinese Classic
2010 Don Quixote
2011 Deadly Will
2011 The Law of Attraction
2012 Guns and Roses
2012 White Deer Plain
2012 Croczilla
2013 Drug War
2013 7 Assassins
2013 Blind Detective
2013 Flash Play
2014 Where Are We Going, Dad?
2014 Coming Home.
2014 When a Peking Family Meets Aupair
2014 Breakup Buddies
2015 Emperor's Holidays
2015 The Dead End
2016 Mr. Nian
2019 Desire Game

Television dramas
 Zhanguo (戰國) (1997) -- as Qin Shi Huang
 Love Like the Galaxy (星汉灿烂) (2022) -- as Cheng Shi

Notes

External links
 

1969 births
Living people
Male actors from Xi'an
Central Academy of Drama alumni
Chinese male stage actors
20th-century Chinese male actors
21st-century Chinese male actors
Chinese male film actors
Chinese male television actors